The Fokker F.III was a single-engined high-winged monoplane aircraft produced in the 1920s by the Dutch aircraft manufacturer Fokker. It could carry five passengers. The aircraft was also built under licence in Germany as the Fokker-Grulich F.III.

Design and development
The Fokker F.III was a straightforward development of the F.II. A widened cabin allowed all five passengers to sit within; in the earlier aircraft, one passenger sat alongside the pilot in his exposed cockpit. Although this unusual arrangement meant that pilots were "burned on one side and frozen on the other," they had a much better view than from the F.II. The view was further improved by a cut-out in the wing leading edge for the pilot's head, allowing his seat to be raised. The external wing struts of the F.II were removed, leaving a clean cantilever wing. The trapezoidal windows seen in the Grulich built F.IIs were standard on the F.III.

Like its predecessor, the F.III was initially powered by a readily available, war surplus 138 kW (185 hp) BMW IIIa engine, but once again KLM re-engined theirs with the 172 kW (230 hp) Armstrong Siddeley Puma.

Operational history
The F.III was first used by KLM when they reopened their Amsterdam-London service on 14 April 1921 (they did not, at this time operate over winter). Soon, F.IIIs were also flying on routes to Bremen, Brussels, Hamburg, and Paris. They proved to be very reliable aircraft. KLM received 14 F.IIIs from Fokker's German factory at Schwerin during 1921 and built two more itself from spares in the following year. This final pair used  Rolls-Royce Eagle VIII engines, with the pilot on the left.

Another operator of new F.IIIs was Deutsch-Russiche Luftverkehrs Gesellschaft (Deruluft) which used nine aircraft on their Berlin-Königsberg-Moscow route from May 1922. These machines, partially built in Schwerin and finished in the Netherlands at Veere, had Eagle engines. One was a Fokker-Grulich.

Deutsche Aero Lloyd gained a licence to build F.IIIs as they had for F.IIs and the company, with its southern subsidiary built and operated 18 of these Fokker-Grulich F.IIIs. Most of these used BMW engines, typically the  BMW IV in preference to the  BMW IIIa. Some of these were re-engined with the  BMW Va, and were designated F.IIIc.

Another operator from new was the Hungarian airline Malert, which received six Dutch-built aircraft for their Budapest-Vienna-Belgrade service from 1922 to 1929. These initially had BMW IIIa engines, but later ran with  Breitfeld & Daněk Hiero IV engines. They had larger wings, increased in area by about 14%. Deutsche Luft-Reederei also operated two, originally intended for KLM. Four F.IIIs probably went to the United States.

Later F.IIIs changed ownership frequently as airlines went bankrupt or merged. They were still flying commercially in Germany until about 1936.

Accidents and incidents
On 24 April 1924, Fokker F.III H-NABS of KLM departed Lympne for Rotterdam and Amsterdam. The aircraft was not heard of again. It was presumed to have crashed into the sea, killing the pilot and both passengers.
On 25 June 1925, a KLM Fokker F.III, registration H-NABM, crashed at Landrécies, France in poor weather while on an Amsterdam-Paris service, killing all four on board.

Operators
 Free City of Danzig
 Deutsche Luft-Reederei

Det Danske Luftfartselskab

Deutsch-Russiche Luftverkehrs Gesellschaft (Deruluft)
Deutsche Aero Lloyd
Deutsche Aero Luft
Sud-deutsche Luft Hansa

Malert

Koninklijke Luchtvaart Maatschappij (KLM)

Deruluft

Specifications

References

Further reading

F 03
1920s Dutch airliners
High-wing aircraft
Single-engined tractor aircraft
Aircraft first flown in 1921